The Xerces Society for Invertebrate Conservation (Xerces Society) is a non-profit environmental organization that focuses on the conservation of invertebrates considered to be essential to biological diversity and ecosystem health. It is named in honor of an extinct California butterfly, the Xerces blue (Glaucopsyche xerces).

The Society collaborates with federal and state agencies including the US Department of Agriculture, as well as scientists, land managers, educators, and citizens to promote invertebrate conservation, applied research, advocacy, public outreach and education. Examples of Xerces Society activities include advocating for invertebrates and their habitats, petitioning for the designation of endangered status for applicable species such as the monarch butterfly,
and public education projects. Ongoing projects include the rehabilitation of habitat for endangered species, public education about the importance of native pollinators, and the restoration and protection of watersheds.

The organization was founded by butterfly scientist Robert Michael Pyle from Yale School of Forestry & Environmental Studies, and was reincorporated with the Oregon Secretary of State on April 14, 1988.

Publications 
 Publications Library

References

Animal conservation organizations
Nature conservation organizations based in the United States
Environmental organizations based in Oregon
Butterfly organizations
Entomological organizations
Invertebrates and humans
Organizations based in Portland, Oregon
Environmental organizations established in 1971
1971 establishments in Oregon
501(c)(3) organizations